The following is a list of the mayors of Mesa, Arizona.

Mesa